In Person may refer to one of several music albums:
In Person (Bobby Timmons album), 1961
In Person (Vince Guaraldi album), 1963
In Person (Cannonball Adderley album), 1968
In Person (Ike & Tina Turner album), 1969
In Person (Sweet Female Attitude album), 2001
In Person (film),  1935 film starring Ginger Rogers
In Person!, 1959 album by Tony Bennett, accompanied by the Count Basie Orchestra
In Person (Canadian TV series), Canadian music variety television series
In Person (American TV series), 1996–1997 talk show

See also
Litigant in person